Ramón Bernardo Soto Alfaro (12 February 1854 – 28 January 1931) was President of Costa Rica from 1885 to 1889.

He took office when his father-in-law, President Próspero Fernández, died in office in 1885, and in a gesture of national conciliation following the fiercely disputed election for his successor, decided to hold himself apart from office on November 7, 1889. He never resigned, but the third vice president Carlos Durán served as acting President until the end of the term.

References

External links 

1854 births
1931 deaths
People from Alajuela
Costa Rican people of Spanish descent
Presidents of Costa Rica
Vice presidents of Costa Rica
Government ministers of Costa Rica
19th-century Costa Rican people
Costa Rican liberals